The Boulevard périphérique de Caen is a ring road circling the French city of Caen. It is the route nationale 814. Traveling speed on the road is limited to 90 km/h (55 mph) between the Exit 13 and 8, with a brief portion near the Exit 1 as well as the Viaduc de Calix limited to 70 km/h (45 mph) and 110 km/h (70 mph) elsewhere. It is a 4-lane hard-shouldered road that was finished on 30 September 1997.

Notable features include the Viaduc de Calix which spans the River Orne and Canal de Caen à la Mer.

History
The idea of creating an urban bypass boulevard dates back to 1931 with the Dauger urbanization plan. The plan was a question of improving traffic by organizing peripheral traffic by means of a boulevard connecting radial roads, so as to form a radioconcentric network. It was revived in the early 1970s with the urban development of the city.
The ring road was opened in stages:
 13 December 1975: opening of the eastern ring road between the Route de Falaise and the Route de la Délivrande.
 19 May 1976: opening of the northern ring road between Route de la Délivrande and Boulevard Weygand (now Boulevard Jean Moulin)
 31 July 1976: extension of the northern ring road between Boulevard Weygand (now Boulevard Jean Moulin) and Chemin Vert
 28 August 1976: junction between the ring road and the N13 (2,500 metres)
 13 September 1978: Déclaration d'utilité publique for the section between the roads of Cherbourg (N13) and Brittany (N175)
 30 September 1997: opening of the last section between Fleury-sur-Orne and Bretteville-sur-Odon

As of 26 April 2015, the ring road is no longer lit at night except on the Viaduc de Calix and the Bessin and Porte de Paris interchanges.

Further work

Northern part
In order to relieve congestion in the northern ring road, a third lane was planned between the Viaduc de Calix and Le Chemin-Vert. Work began in March 2017 with preliminary tree felling work along the relevant section.

Work on the Hamelin ramp began on 15 April 2021 with improvements on the D60. The construction of the ramp itself was carried out in the second half of 2021; it was commissioned on 27 July 2022.

List of junctions
{| class="plainrowheaders wikitable"
|-
!scope=col|Department
!scope=col|Location
!scope=col|km
!scope=col|mi
!scope=col|Junction
!scope=col|Destinations
!scope=col|Notes
|-
|rowspan="16"|Calvados
|rowspan="2"|Mondeville
|0.0
|0.0
| - 1 Porte de Paris
|Paris, Rouen, Le Havre, Deauville, Mondeville and Giberville
|
|-
|1.4
|0.9
| - 2 Presqu'île-Rives de l'Orne
|Mondeville, Colombelles, Caen station; Route de la Côte Fleurie
|
|-
|rowspan="2"|Hérouville-Saint-Clair
|2.9
|1.8
| - 3 Porte d'Angleterre
|Ouistreham, Caen (Saint-Jean-Eudes)
|
|-
|3.8
|2.4
|4 Pierre Heuzé
|Hérouville-Saint-Clair, Caen (Pierre Heuzé)
|
|-
|rowspan="3"|Caen
|5.2
|3.2
| - 5 Côte de Nacre
|Douvres-la-Délivrande, Épron, Caen (campus 1, Calvaire Saint-Pierre)
|
|-
|6.2
|3.9
|6 Vallée des Jardins
|Saint-Contest, Caen (Vallée des Jardins, La Folie Couvrechef - Mémorial)
|
|-
|8.0
|5.0
| - 7  Chemin Vert
|Saint-Germain-la-Blanche-Herbe, Caen (Chemin vert, La Maladrerie)
|
|-
|rowspan="1"|Saint-Germain-la-Blanche-Herbe
|9.9
|6.2
| - 8 Porte de Bessin
|Cherbourg, Bayeux
|
|-
|rowspan="1"|Bretteville-sur-Odon
|13.2
|8.2
| - 9 Porte de Bretagne
|Vire-Normandie, Rennes, Nantes
|
|-
|rowspan="1"|Éterville
|14.6
|9.1
| - 10 Éterville
|Louvigny, Caen (la Prairie)
|
|-
|rowspan="3"|Ifs
|18.1
|11.2
|11 Suisse Normande
|Flers, Fleury-sur-Orne, Caen (Grâce de Dieu)
|
|-
|21.0
|13.1
|12 Ifs
|Ifs, Caen (campus 3)
|
|-
|22.1
|13.7
| - 13 Porte d'Espagne
|Alençon, Le Mans, Tours
|
|-
|rowspan="2"|Cormelles-le-Royal
|23.3
|14.5
| - 14 Cormelles
|Cormelles-le-Royal, Caen (Guérinière)
|
|-
|24.5
|15.2
|15 Vallée Sèche
|Grentheville, Caen (Sainte-Thérèse)
|
|-
|rowspan="1"|Mondeville
|26.6
|16.3
| - 16 Pays d'Auge
|Lisieux, Caen (Demi-Lune)
|
|-

Notes

Ring roads in France
Caen
Transport in Normandy